Television addiction is a proposed addiction model associated with maladaptive or compulsive behavior associated with watching television programming.

Analysis
The most recent medical review on this model concluded that pathological television watching behavior may constitute a true behavioral addiction, but indicated that much more research on this topic is needed to demonstrate this. The compulsion can be extremely difficult to control in many cases. The television addiction model has parallels to other forms of behavioral addiction, such as addiction to drugs or gambling, which are also forms of compulsive behavior.

Recognition
Television addiction is not a diagnosable condition of DSM-IV.

Similarities with DSM-V for substance use disorder.

Possible Behavioral Effects 

 Sleeping Problems
 Sedentary Lifestyle
 Anti-social Behavior
 Weight Gain
 Attention Deficit Hyperactivity Disorder (ADHD)

See also
Addiction
Social aspects of television
Television consumption
Video game addiction

References

External links
Article by Michael D. Pollock "How I Overcame TV Addiction, Reclaimed My Life and Gained Two Extra Months Per Year"
Reader's Digest Article

Behavioral addiction
Addiction
Addiction
Digital media use and mental health

de:Verhaltenssucht